Mark Chasan is an American entrepreneur and lawyer known for founding eMusic, the first digital media streaming and distribution service, and Webcentral, one of the first cloud hosting companies. Chasan currently is the CEO of Transformative, an eco-social consulting firm, and AWE Global, a sustainable development company. Chasan has pioneered new financial models and process for liquidity and value creation utilizing a private-to-public strategy.

Early life and education 
Mark Chasan was born in Los Angeles, California as the first of three sons to Roslyn and Fred Chasan  As a young child, he was a Cub Scout. He started playing music at age 10, studying drums, percussion, and piano.

He graduated with both Bachelor of Laws and Juris Doctor degrees in 1985 from Western State University's College of Law and became a lawyer, opening his practice in Los Angeles.

Business career 
In 1995, Chasan founded eMusic in Marina del Ray, California, which aimed to create a new market sector for digital media sales. Chasan pioneered new technology allowing for digital audio clips, album art, and user reviews to be posted to the website. The service quickly gained adoption and exclipsed 100,000 titles and features. Later that year, Billboard magazine featured Chasan and eMusic alongside Ticketmaster as the top ten digital media retailers.

One the next year, Chasan and his team invented new technology to address the early limitations with digital media streaming, aimed at reducing download times and increasing the sound quality, while still keeping affordable prices for consumers. Additional server bandwdith was needed beyond what was comemrcially available at the time, leading Chasan to found Webcentral, one of the first cloud co-hosting, and co-location data center companies. Webcentral grew to power the websites of Caltrans, Re/Max, AudioNet, Broadcast.com and in 1997 Chasan sold the company to Interworld Communications.

In 1998, Chasan partnered with Nordic Entertainment to increase the catalogue available to eMusic customers. In 1998, eMusic and its affiliates including music label Radiant Records and logistics business Creative Fulfillment merged with Goodnoise forming a new company which continued to be known as eMusic. The combined company completed its initial public offering on the Nasdaq a few months later using the eMusic name. eMusic subsequently acquired its partner Nordic Entertainment.

After eMusic's initial public offering and Webcentral's acquisition, Chasan became a professional angel investor and later led IBM's digital media consulting division. He then co-founded Publex Ventures, a technology venture capital firm which specialized in accelerating the growth of early-stage companies with IPOs. After exiting Publex, Chasan founded Transformative in 2005, a consulting company designed to help build eco-social impact businesses, and AWE Global, a development company for sustainable and regenerative communities.

In 2022, Chasan authored Living in AWE, which became the top selling book in environmental economics on Amazon. Additionally, he has written on a variety of environmental, social, and corporate governance subjects in souces such as HuffPost and Planetary Experts and spoken on related topics at conferences such as BOTES, Clean Tech Innovation & Growth, and Sustainatopia.

See also 

 eMusic

References

American businesspeople
California lawyers
Living people
Writers from Los Angeles
Textbook writers
Year of birth missing (living people)
American chief executives
Western State University College of Law alumni
IBM people